Dahaneh-ye Meymand (also Romanized as Dahaneh-ye Meymand; also known as Sar Dahaneh-ye Meymand) is a village in Fareghan Rural District, Fareghan District, Hajjiabad County, Hormozgan Province, Iran. At the 2006 census, its population was 203, in 58 families.

References 

Populated places in Hajjiabad County